The United States Housing and Economic Recovery Act of 2008 (commonly referred to as HERA) was designed primarily to address the subprime mortgage crisis. It authorized the Federal Housing Administration to guarantee up to $300 billion in new 30-year fixed rate mortgages for subprime borrowers if lenders wrote down principal loan balances to 90 percent of current appraisal value.  It was intended to restore confidence in Fannie Mae and Freddie Mac by strengthening regulations and injecting capital into the two large U.S. suppliers of mortgage funding.  States are authorized to refinance subprime loans using mortgage revenue bonds.  Enactment of the Act led to the government conservatorship of Fannie Mae and Freddie Mac.

Legislative history 

The Act was passed by the United States Congress on July 24, 2008 and signed by President George W. Bush on July 30, 2008.

Subsequent amendments 

Some provisions of the law were modified by the American Recovery and Reinvestment Act of 2009, which was signed into law by President Obama on February 17, 2009.

Federal Housing Finance Agency 
The Act also established the Federal Housing Finance Agency (FHFA) out of the Federal Housing Finance Board (FHFB) and Office of Federal Housing Enterprise Oversight (OFHEO).

Through the powers granted to FHFA, created by the Act, on September 7, 2008, FHFA director James B. Lockhart III announced he had put Fannie Mae and Freddie Mac under the conservatorship of the FHFA. The action is "one of the most sweeping government interventions in private financial markets in decades".

Subtitles of the Act

Housing Assistance Tax Act of 2008 

Included a first-time home buyer refundable tax credit for purchases on or after April 9, 2008 and before July 1, 2009 equal to 10 percent of the purchase price of a principal residence, up to $7,500.
Phased out the credit for taxpayers with incomes over $75,000 ($150,000 for joint returns).
Required taxpayers receiving the credit to repay it over 15 years in equal installments by imposing a surcharge on the taxpayers’ annual income tax.
The Act provided emergency assistance for the redevelopment of abandoned and foreclosed homes.

FHA Modernization Act of 2008 

An FHA loan is a mortgage loan whose repayment is guaranteed by the Federal Housing Administration (FHA).

The Act:
Increased the FHA loan limit from 95 percent to 110 percent of area median home price up to 150 percent of the GSE conforming loan limit, or $625,000), effective January 1, 2009.
Required a down payment of at least 3.5 percent for any FHA loan.
Limited of regulation can Placed a 12-month moratorium second U.S. Dept. of Housing and Urban Development implementation of risk-based premiums.
Prohibited seller-funded down payments.

Federal Housing Finance Regulatory Reform Act of 2008 

This statute established the Federal Housing Finance Agency (FHFA) as an independent federal agency.

HOPE for Homeowners Act of 2008 

Authorized the FHA to insure up to $300 billion of 30-year fixed rate refinance loans up to 90% of appraised value for distressed borrowers.
Covered mortgage commitments made on or before January 1, 2008.
Required existing mortgage holders to accept the proceeds of the insured loan as payment in full for all pre-existing indebtedness.
Lender participation in this program was not required but voluntary to cover financial.

As of February 2009, only 451 applications had been received and 25 loans finalized, far short of the estimated 400,000 homeowners who were expected to participate. This was attributed to high fees, high interest rates, the need for a reduction in principal on the part of the lender, and the requirement that the federal government receive 50% of any appreciation in value of the house. Congress began hearings on the program in February.

Mortgage Disclosure Improvement Act of 2008

Secure and Fair Enforcement for Mortgage Licensing Act of 2008 

"Secure and Fair Enforcement for Mortgage Licensing Act" (12 United States Code, Section 5100, et seq.), passed by Congress and signed by President G.W. Bush in 2008, required all states to implement a Mortgage Loan Originator (MLO) licensing and registration system by August 1, 2009 (August 1, 2010 for legislatures that meet biennially). States can operate their own systems, subject to stringent federal standards, or they can participate in the Nationwide Multi-State Licensing System and Registry (NMLS), a service operated jointly by the Conference of State Bank Supervisors and the American Association of Residential Mortgage Regulators (CSBS/AARMR). If the state's licensing and registration program does not meet minimum standards at any time, the U.S. Department of Housing and Urban Development (HUD) is empowered to step in and impose a compliant system upon the state.

The objectives of the SAFE Act include aggregating and improving the flow of information to and between regulators; providing increased accountability and tracking of MLOs; enhancing consumer protections; supporting anti-fraud measures; and providing consumers with easily accessible information at no charge regarding the employment history of and publicly adjudicated disciplinary and enforcement actions against MLOs.

Upon registration, MLOs are provided with a Unique Identifier number. All MLOs and their employers are required to provide this unique identifier to anyone who requests it, and the federally chartered mortgage institutions, Fannie Mae and Freddie Mac, require that it be placed on all loan documents for loans that they purchase. Consumers will be able to use this number to obtain basic information on any registered MLO. This information includes name and aliases, employment history, current employment and contact information, negative civil judgments or settlements, and disciplinary and criminal history.

The Act and the implementing regulations, which were issued jointly by the federal banking agencies in 2010, define a "mortgage loan originator" as any individual who both takes residential loan applications and "offers or negotiates" residential mortgage loan terms. Additionally, the individual must undertake these activities for economic gain (i.e., get paid for it). Persons who perform merely clerical or administrative tasks in connection with loan origination are not considered MLOs. The terms, "taking a mortgage loan application" and "offering or negotiating terms" are defined very broadly so that just about any person in the underwriting process who has more than cursory contact with a potential borrower is an MLO. Mortgage loans include financing and refinancing transactions, reverse mortgages, home equity lines of credit and just about any other credit transaction secured by a first or junior lien on a dwelling.

Not all persons who qualify as MLOs are required to become licensed or to register with the newly renamed Nationwide Multi-State Licensing System and Registry (NMLS). Licensed Realtors and MLOs who work for federally regulated financial institutions, for example, are not required to be licensed as MLOs, although they are required to register. Those who would otherwise be required to register are exempted if they have (1) never been registered before and (2) perform five or fewer mortgage loan originations in any rolling twelve-month period. Registration must be renewed annually, and registrants must submit fingerprints for a criminal background check along with their first registration application.

See also 
 Homeowners Refinancing Act (1933)

References

External links
 Housing and Economic Recovery Act of 2008 as amended (PDF/details) in the GPO Statute Compilations collection
 Housing and Economic Recovery Act of 2008 as enacted (details) in the US Statutes at Large

Act summary

Enactment news

Congressional Votes 
  http://www.govtrack.us/congress/bill.xpd?bill=h110-3221

Acts of the 110th United States Congress
2008 in economics
United States federal housing legislation
Subprime mortgage crisis
United States federal legislation articles without infoboxes